Yang Amat Mulia Pengiran Anak Khairul Khalil (born 28 February 1975) is the eldest son and second child of Pengiran Syed Haji Jaafari bin Pengiran Syed Haji Mashor and Hajah Dayang Sarabanun bini Haji Abdi Manaf. The eldest child in the family is a daughter and Pengiran Khairul Khalil also has two younger siblings: a brother and sister.

Pengiran Khairul Khalil holds a BTEC Higher National Diploma in Building Studies from the University of Teesside, United Kingdom. He is currently the Assistant Executive Officer at the Prime Minister's Office. His hobbies are graphic designing, multimedia and video production, interior designing, and football.

Marriage
On 10 June 2007, Pengiran Anak Khairul Khalil married Princess Majeedah Bolkiah.

Issue
They had issue, one son and one daughter:

 'Abdu'l Hafeez. Born at Istana Nur ul-Iman, Bandar Seri Begawan, on 18 March 2008.
 Raihaanah Hanaa-Ul Bolqiah. Born at Istana Nur ul-Iman, Bandar Seri Begawan, on 6 January 2010.

References

1975 births
Bruneian people of Arab descent
Bruneian royalty
Living people
Alumni of Teesside University